Joy of Nothing is the second studio album by Northern Irish singer-songwriter Foy Vance. It was released on 26 August 2013.

Background
The album was inspired by Vance's relocation to the Scottish highlands.

Critical reception
AllMusic wrote that the album is "not afraid of making a grandiose statement, both musically and lyrically." No Depression wrote: "Even if there aren’t a lot of fireworks going off on this one, Vance’s mellifluous brogue and poet’s soul are more than enough to get you started on a Foy diet you’ll never want to come off of."

Track listing

Personnel
Foy Vance – vocals, acoustic guitar, electric guitar, baritone guitar, additional piano
 Michael Keeney – piano, mini moog, sounds, fender rhodes, melotron
 Colm McClean – electric guitar, acoustic rhythm guitar, pedal steel guitar
 Paul 'Hammy' Hamilton – drums, percussion, backing vocals
 Conor McCreanor – electric bass, upright bass
Bonnie Raitt – vocals 
Ed Sheeran – vocals 
 The Arco String Quartet
 Clare Hadwen – violin
 Kathleen Gillespie – violins
 Richard Hadwen – viola
 Kerry Brady – cello

References

2013 albums
Foy Vance albums
Glassnote Records albums